Santa Rosa de Viterbo is a municipality in the state of São Paulo in Brazil. The population is 26,753 (2020 est.) in an area of 289 km². The elevation is 675 m.

References

External links
  Official Site of Santa Rosa de Viterbo City Hall

Municipalities in São Paulo (state)